The 2013 season was York Region Shooters's 16th season in the Canadian Soccer League. The club returned to the top four by finishing second in the First Division, and finished in the top four with the best offensive, and defensive record. The organization qualified for the playoffs for the 11th consecutive season, but saw an early departure in the preliminary round. Their reserve side managed to also play in the postseason by finishing seventh in the Second Division. Their playoff journey began with victory in the opening round, but were eliminated in the following round. The club`s top goalscorer was Richard West with 19 goals who managed to end Kadian Lecky`s seven year streak.

Summary  
In the off season a dispute occurred between the Canadian Soccer League, and the Canadian Soccer Association (CSA) after the CSA unexpectedly removed sanctioning to the CSL just months before kickoff. The issue was resolved after the CSL appealed to the Sport Dispute Resolution Centre of Canada (SDRCC), where the sport arbitrator forced the governing body to reinstate sanctioning to the CSL for another season. Meanwhile York Region made preparations for the 2013 season by assigning longtime team manager John Pacione with head coach responsibilities. Pacione assembled a roster with a mixture of imports with International and European experience along with Vaughan`s traditional veteran core players. In the initial stages of the season the club experienced a slight delay in performance, but quickly rebounded with an eight match undefeated streak. The team managed another undefeated streak with five matches, and concluded the regular season as runner`s up in the First Division.

Throughout the season York Region posted the second best defensive record, and the third best offensive record. The club also produced another solid home field performance by only losing two matches at home. In the postseason the Shooters were eliminated from the tournament in the opening round to London City SC in a penalty shootout. In the Second Division the reserve team was managed by league veteran Sam Medeiros, where they managed to secure a playoff berth by finishing seventh in the standings. In the preliminary round they defeated Niagara United B, but were knocked out by Toronto Croatia B in the semifinals.

York Region also formed a partnership with Empoli F.C. through the Italian Soccer Management, which provides opportunities for camps and scouting of players.

Club

Management

First Division roster
As of November 14, 2013.

Second Division roster

Transfers

In

Out

Competitions summary

Regular season

First division

Results summary

Results by round

Matches

Postseason

Second division

Statistics

Goals 
Correct as of November 14, 2013

References 

York Region Shooters
York Region Shooters
2013